The Siouxland Conference is a ten team high school athletic conference in the northwest corner of Iowa, consisting of schools ranging from the smallest class (1A) to the third largest class (3A), and known for its prominence in small school basketball.

Members

Incoming Member

Common cooperatives

History

The Siouxland Conference was founded in 1952 and began play in the 1953–54 school year. Originally the league was made up of: Inwood, George and Rock Rapids from Lyon County; Orange City, and Hawarden from Sioux County; and Akron and Le Mars Gehlen from Plymouth County. Rock Valley replaced Augustana Academy of Canton, South Dakota, in 1960. West Sioux of Hawarden left the conference in 1965, and rejoined for a short period in the 1970s. Boyden–Hull became a conference member by 1965. Sioux Center, formerly of the Sioux Empire Conference, and Central Lyon of Rock Rapids joined the Siouxland Conference in 1967. Akron withdrew from the league at the conclusion of the 1975 baseball season. Little Rock merged with George to become George–Little Rock in 1989. The league then went through a set of changes in the early 1990s when it added Sibley-Ocheyedan from the Lakes Conference, and Hartley–Melvin–Sanborn and Okoboji from the disbanded Sioux Valley Conference. Maurice-Orange City merged with Floyd Valley to become MOC-Floyd Valley in 1994. The conference remained the same until Hartley–Mevin–Sanborn left for the War Eagle Conference in 2009 and longtime Sibley-Ocheyedan rival Sheldon moved in from the Lakes Conference. Current War Eagle Conference member Unity Christian, located in Orange City, Iowa has applied for membership to the conference at least 3 times, and been denied each time. Former Lake Conference member and current independent Western Christian has applied twice, and denied each time as well.

On 20 September 2022, George-Little Rock applied for membership to the War Eagle Conference. The War Eagle Conference approved membership of the Mustangs on October 20, 2022.

In October of 2022, the conference finally accepted the membership application of Unity Christian, whom will swap conferences with George-Little Rock.

Basketball

Men
As an independent school, Sioux Center won the big school state title in 1959, followed by the small school state title in 1967, in its first year within the Siouxland Conference. Maurice-Orange City claimed the 2A state championship in 1987–88 and again in 1988–89, and won the 3A title in 2004–05 as MOC-Floyd Valley. Rock Valley has won the championship in 1996, 1998, 2009, and 2010. In 2003, Boyden-Hull was class 1A state champ, while Sioux Center won the 2A title. George–Little Rock won the 1A title in 2006. Boyden-Hull won back to back 1A titles in 2012 and 2013. In 2013, Sheldon also won the 2A championship. West Lyon won the 1A championship in 2014, keeping it in the conference for three straight years. Boyden–Hull won its first 2A title in 2020. The Comets competed in the 2A basketball final again in 2021, losing to Western Christian, a team also located in Hull, as a member of the Lakes Conference. It was the first time since 2005 that the two teams had played against each other, and also the first time in Iowa High School Athletic Association history that two teams from the same city met in a title game.

Women
Sibley-Ocheyedan won two basketball titles (1986 and 1996), while Rock Valley has three (2001–2003). Central Lyon won the 1A title in 2013. MOC–Floyd Valley won the 3A championship the following season, besting their previous best result, second place in 1997.

Other sports
The schools hold many other state titles as well, including football, which is no longer a sanctioned conference sport since the state took control of the entire system in the mid-1990s and created a two-year rotating district system. Nevertheless, Sibley holds a title, while Sioux Center has two and Central Lyon holds two on their own and one more sharing with George–Little Rock with 2 runners-up in class 2A. West Lyon has won five titles (1998, 1999, 2010, 2013, 2019) and finished as class 1A runner up in 2008 and 2014 and 2A runner up in 1995. Boyden-Hull/Rock Valley was class 2A runner up for football in 2009. Before sharing sports with Rock Valley, Boyden-Hull tied West Harrison for the 1970 Class B track championship. Maurice-Orange City has won the state track championship three times, Sioux Center twice, George and Okoboji once each. Rock Valley has three state golf titles, all won as a member of the Siouxland Conference. Central Lyon and Sheldon have each won a cross country championship. Sibley-Ocheyedan won a women's Class 2A cross country title in 1997. Rock Valley is the only team in the conference to win a baseball championship.

Sports offered
The conference offers the following sports:
 Summer – baseball and softball
 Fall – football, cross country and volleyball
 Winter – basketball and wrestling
 Spring – track and field and golf

References

External links
 

High school sports in Iowa
1952 establishments in Iowa
Sports leagues established in 1952